Zoë Soul (born Zoë Soul Borde; November 1, 1995) is an American actress. She is best known for her role as Cali Sanchez in the 2014 film The Purge: Anarchy, and as Kaci Reynolds in the 2011 American family sitcom Reed Between the Lines.

Career
As a teenager, Soul was represented by the modeling agency Ford Models, in addition to pursuing a career in acting. From 2011 to 2015, Soul played Kaci Reynolds in 25 episodes of Reed Between the Lines, which originally aired on BET. Soul gained recognition for her performance as Eliza Birch in the 2013 film Prisoners, directed by Denis Villeneuve, where she shared an NBR Award for Best Ensemble Cast, alongside Hugh Jackman, Jake Gyllenhaal, and Viola Davis.  Soul is also a singer and dancer, and performs with her band Zoë and the Bear.

Filmography

Film

Television

Recognition
 2013, NBR Award for 'best ensemble cast' for Prisoners

References

External links
 

1995 births
Living people
African-American actresses
American film actresses
American television actresses
American people of Dutch descent
American people of Trinidad and Tobago descent
21st-century American actresses
21st-century African-American women
21st-century African-American people